= Agulugou Formation =

Geologic formation in Inner Mongolia, China

- Type: Geological Formation

Location
- Region: Inner Mongolia Autonomous Region
- Country: China

The Agulugou Formation is located in the Inner Mongolia Autonomous Region and is dated to the Jurassic period.
